Duncan Campbell may refer to:

Military figures
 Sir Duncan Campbell, 2nd Baronet (1597–1645), commander of troops in Ireland
 Duncan Campbell (died 1758), Scottish nobleman and British Army officer
 Duncan Campbell (British Army officer, died 1837) (1763–1837), British Army general, MP for Ayr Burghs 1809–18
 Duncan Carter-Campbell of Possil (1911–1990), British Army colonel

Musicians
 Duncan Campbell (trumpeter) (born 1926), Scottish musician
 Duncan Campbell (singer) (born 1958), lead singer of UB40

Politicians
 Duncan Campbell, 1st Lord Campbell (died 1453/4), Scottish nobleman and politician
 Sir Duncan Campbell, 2nd Baronet (died 1645), MP for Argyllshire 1628–43
 Duncan J. Campbell (1845–1882), physician and politician, Nova Scotia, Canada
 Duncan Campbell (Unionist politician) (1876–1916), MP for North Ayrshire 1911–16

Journalists
 Duncan Campbell (journalist, born 1944), journalist on crime and Latin America
 Duncan Campbell (journalist) (born 1952), investigative journalist and television producer, best known for his work on Signals Intelligence

Others
 Duncan Campbell (soothsayer) (1680–1730), Scottish deaf-mute and professed soothsayer
 Duncan Campbell (revivalist) (1898–1972), Scottish preacher
 Duncan Campbell (snooker player) (born 1966), Scottish snooker player
 Duncan Campbell (artist) (born 1972), Irish artist
 Duncan Campbell (snowboarder) (born 1997), New Zealand snowboarder
 Duncan B. Campbell, ancient historian
 Duncan Campbell (settler), British settler to South Africa
 Duncan Campbell (inventor) (born 1955/56), Canadian co-inventor of murderball

See also
 Duncan Campbell Ross (1871–1961), Canadian lawyer and Liberal politician